Raggahawatta Grama Niladhari Division is a Grama Niladhari Division of the Kaduwela Divisional Secretariat of Colombo District of Western Province, Sri Lanka. It has Grama Niladhari Division Code 474A.

Raggahawatta is a surrounded by the Hewagama, Mahadeniya, Biyagama South, Welivita and Mabima West Grama Niladhari Divisions.

Demographics

Ethnicity 

The Raggahawatta Grama Niladhari Division has a Sinhalese majority (95.8%). In comparison, the Kaduwela Divisional Secretariat (which contains the Raggahawatta Grama Niladhari Division) has a Sinhalese majority (95.6%)

Religion 

The Raggahawatta Grama Niladhari Division has a Buddhist majority (81.0%) and a significant Roman Catholic population (14.9%). In comparison, the Kaduwela Divisional Secretariat (which contains the Raggahawatta Grama Niladhari Division) has a Buddhist majority (90.4%)

References 

Grama Niladhari Divisions of Kaduwela Divisional Secretariat